Eupithecia succernata is a moth in the family Geometridae, described by Heinrich Benno Möschler in 1886. It is found in Jamaica.

References

Moths described in 1886
succernata
Moths of the Caribbean